The Department of Health and Family Services was an Australian government department that existed between March 1996 and October 1998.

The Department was created after the 1996 federal election in which a new Government was elected, gaining responsibility for the Supported Accommodation Assistance Program from the former Department of Housing and Regional Development.

Scope
Information about the department's functions and/or government funding allocation could be found in the Administrative Arrangements Orders, the annual Portfolio Budget Statements, in the Department's annual reports and on the Department's website.

According to the Administrative Arrangements Order (AAO) made on 11 March 1996, the Department dealt with:
Services for the aged, people with disabilities and families with children 
Community support services 
Public health and medical research 
Health promotion and disease prevention
Primary health care of Aboriginal and Torres Strait Islander people
Pharmaceutical benefits
Health benefits schemes
Specific health services, including human quarantine 
National drug abuse strategy
Regulation of quality of therapeutic goods

Structure
The Department was an Australian Public Service department, staffed by officials who were responsible to the Minister.

The Secretary of the Department was Andrew Podger.

References

Ministries established in 1996
Health and Family Services
1996 establishments in Australia
1998 disestablishments in Australia